Abaza Siyavuş Pasha (died 23 February 1688) was a short term grand vizier of the Ottoman Empire who held the post during one of the most chaotic periods of the empire.

Early years 
He was of Abkhazian origin. He was a servant of Köprülü Mehmed Pasha, an able grand vizier who died in 1661. By marrying Köprülü Mehmed Pasha's daughter, he became a relative of the powerful Köprülü family. Together with his brothers-in-law (Köprülüzade Fazıl Ahmed Pasha and Köprülüzade Fazıl Mustafa Pasha), he participated in a number of military campaigns. In 1684, Buda (a part of Budapest, the capital of modern Hungary, then a part of Ottoman Empire) had been besieged by the Austrians under the command of Maximilian. Siyavuş Pasha stormed the Austrians and forced them to lift the siege. This was one of the few Turkish victories in the Great Turkish War.

As a grand vizier 
Ottoman sultan Mehmet IV ("the Hunter") was inattentive to state affairs, especially in the war. The soldiers as well as the other subjects of the empire accused him as well as grand vizier Sarı Süleyman Pasha of the failures in the war. In 1687, the army returned from the front and staged a coup in which both the sultan and the grand vizier were forced to abdicate and resign, respectively. Siyavuş became the new grand vizier on 18 September, and Süleyman II became the new sultan on 8 November. However, Siyavuş was not successful as a grand vizier. He failed to control the troops which encamped in the outskirts of Constantinople. The soldiers demanded for the payment of bonus salary (traditional payments of the new sultans). But the treasury was unable to make the payment and the soldiers caused unrest in the city. Although, Siyavuş was their candidate for the post, they soon began to oppose Siyavuş and his brother in law Köprülü Mustafa Pasha. The Janissaries raided his house and killed him on 23 February 1688.

See also 
 List of Ottoman Grand Viziers

References

Abazins
17th-century Grand Viziers of the Ottoman Empire
Year of birth unknown
1688 deaths
People from the Ottoman Empire of Abkhazian descent
Pashas